Mad About Men is a 1954 British Technicolor comedy film directed by Ralph Thomas and starring Glynis Johns, Donald Sinden, Anne Crawford and Margaret Rutherford. It was written by Peter Blackmore, who also wrote the 1948 film Miranda which preceded Mad About Men. Johns appears in both films as the mermaid Miranda. However, Rank Films insisted it was not a sequel.

The film was shot at Pinewood Studios and on location at Polperro in Cornwall and Long Crendon in Oxfordshire. Filming also took place in Brighton including at the Palace Pier. The film's sets were designed by the art director George Provis.

Plot
When gymnastics school teacher Caroline goes on holiday at her family's home in Cornwall, she meets her distant mermaid relative Miranda, who looks exactly like her. She agrees to let Miranda trade places with her, while she goes on a bicycling trip with a friend. Caroline feigns an accident, pretending that this requires her to use a wheelchair for a few weeks, thus providing a cover for the fact that Miranda has a fish tail instead of legs. Nurse Carey, who knows about Miranda [and was in the earlier film], is hired to attend Miranda.

Caroline is engaged to Ronald Baker, but when he shows up, Miranda does not like him at all. She decides to make Caroline a better match. She flirts outrageously with two eligible bachelors, Jeff Saunders and Colonel Barclay Sutton, right in front of Ronald. When she discovers that Ronald works in the government sanitation department (and approves of dumping garbage into the ocean), she dumps a tureen of cold soup on his head.

Meanwhile, Barbara Davenport, the colonel's fiancée, takes an understandable dislike to Miranda. While out swimming, she discovers Miranda's secret and arranges for "Caroline" to sing at a charity concert, plotting to reveal her true nature. Caroline reads about the forthcoming concert during her holiday, guesses what Barbara intends, and rushes back to take Miranda's place, foiling Barbara's scheme.

Afterward, Jeff takes Caroline boating. When he tries to kiss her, she resists at first, then willingly gives in, while a somewhat sad Miranda watches.

Cast

 Glynis Johns as Caroline Trewella / Miranda Trewella
 Donald Sinden as Jeff Saunders
 Anne Crawford as Barbara Davenport
 Margaret Rutherford as Nurse Carey
 Dora Bryan as Berengaria, a mermaid friend of Miranda
 Nicholas Phipps as Colonel Barclay Sutton
 Peter Martyn as Ronald Baker
 Noell Purcell as Percy, a fisherman friend of Jeff
 Joan Hickson as Mrs Forster
 Judith Furse as Viola
 Irene Handl as Mme. Blanche
 David Hurst as Signor Mantalini, a musician
 Martin Miller as Dr. Fergus, a biologist
 Deryck Guyler as Editor
 Anthony Oliver as Pawnbroker
 Lawrence Ward as Alphonse
 Martin Boddey as 	Marco 
 Ken Richmond as 	Zampa
 Harry Welchman as 	Symes 
 Meredith Edwards as Police Constable 
 Lucy Griffiths as Dr. Fergus' Secretary 
 John Horsley as Sports Organiser
 Stringer Davis as the Vicar
 Henry B. Longhurst as 	Mayor 
 Gibb McLaughlin as 	Ticket Collector
 Dandy Nichols as Nurse Carey's Landlady
 George Woodbridge as 	Fisherman Outside Pub
 Damaris Hayman as 	Tall Choral Society Singer

Critical reception
Radio Times called the film "outdated hokum, a cliché-ridden story...this is certainly not the equal of the charming original."

AllMovie praised it as a "delightful sequel to the saucy British comedy-fantasy Miranda."

References

External links 
 
 
 

1954 films
1954 romantic comedy films
1950s fantasy comedy films
British romantic comedy films
British fantasy comedy films
Color sequels of black-and-white films
Films about mermaids
Films directed by Ralph Thomas
Films produced by Betty Box
Films scored by Benjamin Frankel
Films set in Cornwall
Films shot in Cornwall
Films shot in East Sussex
Films shot at Pinewood Studios
1950s English-language films
1950s British films